Rhytiphora is a genus of flat-faced longhorn beetles in the Pteropliini tribe of the subfamily Lamiinae. The genus was first described in 1835 by Jean Guillaume Audinet-Serville.

The Australian longhorn beetles in the subfamily, Lamiinae, were revised in 2013 by Slipinski and Escalona, and the entire genus, Rhytiphora, was revised by Tavikilian and Nearns in 2014. Thus the list of species below may be incomplete.

Species

subgenus Rhytiphora (Platyomopsis) Thomson, 1857
 Rhytiphora albocincta (Guérin-Méneville, 1831)
 Rhytiphora armatula (White, 1859)
 Rhytiphora basalis (Aurivillius, 1917)
 Rhytiphora cana (McKeown, 1948)
 Rhytiphora decipiens (Pascoe, 1863)
 Rhytiphora fraserensis (Blackburn, 1892)
 Rhytiphora frenchi (Blackburn, 1890)
 Rhytiphora mjoebergi (Aurivillius, 1917)
 Rhytiphora multispinis Breuning, 1938
 Rhytiphora nigrovirens (Donovan, 1805)
 Rhytiphora obenbergeri Breuning, 1938
 Rhytiphora obliqua (Donovan, 1805)
 Rhytiphora petrorhiza (Boisduval, 1835)
 Rhytiphora pubiventris (Pascoe, 1862)
 Rhytiphora regularis (Gahan, 1893)
 Rhytiphora spinosa (Thomson, 1864)
 Rhytiphora subminiata (Pascoe, 1866)
 Rhytiphora subregularis Breuning, 1973
 Rhytiphora torquata (Pascoe, 1875)
 Rhytiphora tuberculigera Breuning, 1938
 Rhytiphora vestigialis (Pascoe, 1864)
 Rhytiphora vicaria (Pascoe, 1865)
 Rhytiphora viridescens Breuning, 1938
 Rhytiphora wallacei (Pascoe, 1864)

subgenus Rhytiphora (Rhytiphora) Audinet-Serville, 1835
 Rhytiphora affinis Breuning, 1970
 Rhytiphora albospilota Aurivillius, 1893
 Rhytiphora antennalis Breuning, 1938
 Rhytiphora argentata Breuning, 1938
 Rhytiphora argenteolateralis McKeown, 1948
 Rhytiphora cretata Pascoe, 1859 
 Rhytiphora crucensis McKeown, 1948
 Rhytiphora cruciata (Pascoe, 1875)
 Rhytiphora dallasi Pascoe, 1869
 Rhytiphora denisoniana Slipinski & Escalona, 2013 (replaced Hathliodes moratus)
 Rhytiphora frenchiana Breuning, 1961
 Rhytiphora intertincta Pascoe, 1867
 Rhytiphora leucolateralis Breuning, 1970
 Rhytiphora macleayi Lea, 1912
 Rhytiphora marmorea Breuning, 1942
 Rhytiphora mista Newman, 1842
 Rhytiphora ochreomarmorata Breuning, 1939
 Rhytiphora odewahni Pascoe, 1866
 Rhytiphora parantennalis Breuning, 1970
 Rhytiphora polymista Pascoe, 1859
 Rhytiphora rosei Olliff, 1890
 Rhytiphora rubeta Pascoe, 1863
 Rhytiphora rugicollis (Dalman, 1817)
 Rhytiphora sannio Newman, 1838
 Rhytiphora saundersi Pascoe, 1857
 Rhytiphora simsoni Blackburn, 1901
 Rhytiphora subargentata Breuning, 1970
 Rhytiphora transversesulcata Breuning, 1938
 Rhytiphora truncata Breuning, 1940
 Rhytiphora waterhousei Pascoe, 1864

subgenus Rhytiphora (Saperdopsis) Thomson, 1864
 Rhytiphora albescens Breuning, 1938
 Rhytiphora albicollis Breuning, 1938
 Rhytiphora albofasciata Breuning, 1938
 Rhytiphora albolateralis Breuning, 1938
 Rhytiphora albolateraloides Breuning, 1970
 Rhytiphora anaglypta (Pascoe, 1867)
 Rhytiphora arctos (Pascoe, 1865)
 Rhytiphora argus Pascoe, 1867
 Rhytiphora barnardi Breuning, 1982
 Rhytiphora basicristata Breuning, 1938
 Rhytiphora bispinosa Breuning, 1938
 Rhytiphora buruensis Breuning, 1959
 Rhytiphora capreolus (Pascoe, 1867)
 Rhytiphora cinerascens (Aurivillius, 1917)
 Rhytiphora cinnamomea (Pascoe, 1859)
 Rhytiphora corrhenoides Breuning, 1970
 Rhytiphora dawsoni Breuning, 1970
 Rhytiphora dentipes (Blackburn, 1894)
 Rhytiphora deserti (Blackburn, 1896)
 Rhytiphora detrita Hope, 1841
 Rhytiphora devota (Pascoe, 1866)
 Rhytiphora dunni Breuning, 1972
 Rhytiphora farinosa (Pascoe, 1863)
 Rhytiphora fasciata (Blackburn, 1901)
 Rhytiphora ferruginea (Aurivillius, 1917)
 Rhytiphora fumata (Pascoe, 1863)
 Rhytiphora gallus (Pascoe, 1864)
 Rhytiphora heros (Pascoe, 1863)
 Rhytiphora iliaca (Pascoe, 1866)
 Rhytiphora lanosa (Pascoe, 1869)
 Rhytiphora laterialba Breuning, 1938
 Rhytiphora laterivitta Breuning, 1938
 Rhytiphora maculicornis (Pascoe, 1858)
 Rhytiphora marmorata Breuning, 1938
 Rhytiphora modesta (Blackburn, 1890)
 Rhytiphora morata (Pascoe, 1863)
 Rhytiphora neglecta (Pascoe, 1863)
 Rhytiphora neglectoides Breuning, 1966
 Rhytiphora nigroscutellata Breuning, 1966
 Rhytiphora obscura Breuning, 1938
 Rhytiphora obsoleta Breuning, 1938
 Rhytiphora ocellata (Breuning, 1938)
 Rhytiphora ochreobasalis Breuning, 1938
 Rhytiphora ochrescens Breuning, 1970
 Rhytiphora parafarinosa Breuning, 1970
 Rhytiphora pedicornis  (Fabricius, 1775)
 Rhytiphora piligera (MacLeay, 1826)
 Rhytiphora pulverulea (Boisduval, 1835)
 Rhytiphora rubriventris (Breuning, 1938)
 Rhytiphora satelles (Pascoe, 1865)
 Rhytiphora sellata Breuning, 1938
 Rhytiphora solandri (Fabricius, 1775)
 Rhytiphora sospitalis Pascoe, 1865
 Rhytiphora tenimberensis Breuning, 1973
 Rhytiphora timorlautensis (Breuning, 1938)
 Rhytiphora ursus (Breuning, 1938)
 Rhytiphora variolosa (Pascoe, 1862)
 Rhytiphora viridis Breuning, 1938

subgenus Setomopsis
 Rhytiphora amicula White, 1859
 Rhytiphora delicatula McKeown, 1948
 Rhytiphora piperitia Hope, 1841
 Rhytiphora uniformis Blackburn, 1901
 Rhytiphora vermiculosa Breuning, 1970

subgenus Rhytiphora (Trichomopsis) Breuning, 1961
 Rhytiphora lateralis (Pascoe, 1858)
 Rhytiphora pulcherrima Breuning, 1965

other
 Rhytiphora bankii (Fabricius, 1775)
 Rhytiphora abdominalis (White, 1858)

References

External links 

 Rhytiphora occurrence data from GBIF
 

 
Pteropliini